The 2007 Detroit Sports Car Challenge presented by Bosch was the tenth round of the 2007 American Le Mans Series season.  It took place at Belle Isle Circuit, Michigan on September 1, 2007.

Official results
Class winners in bold.  Cars failing to complete 70% of winner's distance marked as Not Classified (NC).

Statistics
 Pole Position - #6 Penske Racing - 1:13.357
 Fastest Lap - #6 Penske Racing - 1:14.993

References

Detroit
Detroit Indy Grand Prix
Detroit Sports Car Challenge
2007 in Detroit
Detroit Sports Car Challenge